Calmann-Lévy  is a French publishing house founded in 1836 by Michel Lévy as Michel Lévy frères. His brother Kalmus Calmann Lévy joined in 1844, and the firm was renamed Calmann Lévy in 1875 after Michel's death.

History
In 1836, Michel Lévy (1821–1875) founded the publishing house of Michel Lévy frères. In 1844, his brother Kalmus "Calmann" Lévy (1819–1891) joined the publishing house. After Michel's death in 1875, Calmann became the sole proprietor and the firm was renamed Calmann Lévy. Shortly before his death, he admitted his three sons into a partnership.
 
By 1875, the company was among the foremost publishing houses of Europe. It was the publisher of most of the important French authors of the second half of the 19th century, including  Balzac, Baudelaire, René Bazin, Gabriele D'Annunzio, Dumas, Flaubert, Victor Hugo, Lamartine, Ernest Renan, George Sand, Stendhal. It 1891, it published the memoirs of the Charles Maurice de Talleyrand-Périgord, and in 1893, the memoirs of Alexis de Tocqueville. In 1893, Calmann was succeeded by his sons Georges, Paul, and Gaston, who went on to publish authors including Anatole France, Pierre Loti and Proust.

During Nazi occupation, Gaston Lévy was interned, and the publishing company, run by the Germans, was renamed  Éditions Balzac in 1943. After the liberation, the company was headed by Léon Pioton.
Authors edited in the postwar period include: Arthur Koestler, Elia Kazan, Anne Frank, and later Donna Leon,  Nicolas Hulot, Patricia Cornwell, Guillaume Musso, among others.

Present day
Since 1993, Calmann-Lévy has been owned by publisher Hachette (which is in turn owned by Lagardère Group).

Book series
 Action, amour, aventure
 Les années du...
 Bibliothèque contemporaine 
 Bibliothèque des voyageurs
 Bibliothèque dramatique
 Bibliothèque littéraire
 Bibliothèque théâtrale
 Bibliothèque des chefs-d'ieuvre du roman contemporain
 Calmann-Lévy collection
 Calmann-Lévy collection nouvelle
 Châteaux, décors de l'histoire
 Collection bleue
 Collection engagements
 Collection Hetzel et Lévy
 Collection le prisme
 Collection les romans de la rose
 Collection le zodiaque
 Collection masques et visages
 Collection Michel Lévy
 Collection Nelson: Chefs-d'oeuvre de la littérature
 Collection Presses Pocket
 Collection roman d'ailleurs
 Diaspora 
 Dimensions SF
 Edition du centenaire
 E. Guillaume et Cie
 Essai société
 Collection France de toujours et d'aujourd'hui
 L'Heure H
 Interstices
 Liberté de l'esprit 
 Le Livre de poche 
 Médailles d'or
 Nouvelle collection historique
 Nouvelle collection illustrée
 Nouvelle collection Michel Lévy
 L'Ordre des choses
 Perspectives économiques
 Pour nos enfants
 Pourpre
 Questions d'actualité
 Le Romantisme des classiques
 Temps & continents
 Traduit de

References

External links

 Une Aventure d'éditeurs au XIXe siècle: Michel et Calmann Lévy (catalogue), exhibition, 25 April-24 May 1986, Bibliothèque nationale, Paris

Publishing companies established in 1836
1836 establishments in France
Publishing companies of France
Book publishing companies of France
French brands
French speculative fiction publishers